Jean-Pierre Moumon (1947 – 1 July 2020) was a French writer, literary critic, and translator in the field of speculative fiction. He often published under the pseudonyms of Rémi Maure , Rémi-Maure, and Jean-Pierre Laigle.

Works

Novels
Ave Caesar Imperator ! (2008)
Retour à Opar (2008)

Anthologies
Dimension Antarès (2018)
Dimension Antarès 2 (2019)

Essays
Planètes pilleuses et autres thématiques de la science-fiction (2013)
L'Anti-Terre (2018)

References

1947 births
2020 deaths
20th-century French male writers
21st-century French male writers
French translators
Writers from Toulon
French speculative fiction writers